Seabrooke is a surname. Notable people with the surname include: 

Elliott Seabrooke (1886–1950), British artist
Georgette Seabrooke (1916–2011), American artist
Glen Seabrooke (born 1967), Canadian ice hockey player
Leonard Seabrooke (born 1974), Australian academic